The Heart of the Yukon is a 1927 American silent adventure film directed by W.S. Van Dyke and starring John Bowers, Anne Cornwall and Edward Hearn.

Cast
 John Bowers as Jim Winston 
 Anne Cornwall as Anita Wayne 
 Edward Hearn as Jack Waite 
 Frank Campeau as Old Skin Full 
 Russell Simpson as 'Cash' Cynon 
 George Jeske as Bartender

References

Bibliography
 Munden, Kenneth White. The American Film Institute Catalog of Motion Pictures Produced in the United States, Part 1. University of California Press, 1997.

External links

1927 films
1927 adventure films
American adventure films
Films directed by W. S. Van Dyke
American silent feature films
Pathé Exchange films
American black-and-white films
1920s English-language films
1920s American films
Silent adventure films